Bulghan may refer to:
 Bulugan, Empress of the Mongol Yuan Empire.
 Bulqan, Azerbaijan